Anderson Luís Ribeiro Pereira or simply Anderson Luís (born July 31, 1988), is a Brazilian footballer who plays as a right-back.

External links

1988 births
Living people
Brazilian footballers
Association football defenders
Campeonato Brasileiro Série A players
Campeonato Brasileiro Série B players
Primeira Liga players
Figueirense FC players
Guaratinguetá Futebol players
Mirassol Futebol Clube players
G.D. Estoril Praia players
F.C. Arouca players
Associação Desportiva São Caetano players
Clube Atlético Penapolense players
Operário Futebol Clube (MS) players
Brazilian expatriate footballers
Expatriate footballers in Portugal
Brazilian expatriate sportspeople in Portugal
Association football midfielders